Samuel Aba (before 990 or  1009 – 5 July 1044) reigned as King of Hungary between 1041 and 1044. He was born to a prominent family with extensive domains in the region of the Mátra Hills. Based on reports in the Gesta Hungarorum and other Hungarian chronicles about the non-Hungarian origin of the Aba family, modern historians write that the Abas headed the Kabar tribes that seceded from the Khazar Khaganate and joined the Hungarians in the 9th century.

Around 1009, Samuel or his father married a sister of Stephen I, the first King of Hungary. Thereafter the originally pagan or Jewish Aba family converted to Christianity. King Stephen appointed Samuel to head the royal court as his palatine. However, the king died in 1038, and the new monarch, Peter the Venetian, removed Samuel from his post.

The Hungarian lords dethroned Peter in 1041 and elected Ispán Samuel as king. According to the unanimous narration of the Hungarian chronicles, Samuel preferred commoners to noblemen, causing discontent among his former partisans. His execution of many opponents brought him into conflict with Bishop Gerard of Csanád. In 1044, Peter the Venetian returned with the assistance of the German monarch, Henry III, who defeated Samuel's larger army at the battle of Ménfő near Győr. Samuel fled from the battlefield but was captured and killed.

Origins and early life

The 13th-century historian Simon of Kéza, and the 14th-century Hungarian chronicles describe the Aba kindred as descendants of Csaba (himself a son of Attila the Hun) by a lady from Khwarezm. Since all Hungarian chronicles emphasize the Orientaleither "Cuman" or "Khwarezmian" origin of the Abas, Gyula Kristó, László Szegfű and other historians propose that the Aba clan descending from them ruled the Kabars, a people of Khazar origin who joined the Hungarians in the middle of the 9th century, before the Hungarians' arrival in the Carpathian Basin around 895. Kristó argues that both Samuel's Khazar origin and his first name suggest that he was born to a family that adhered to Judaism.

Despite the uncertainty over the clan's origins, Samuel undoubtedly descended from a distinguished family, since an unnamed sister of Stephen I, who had in 1000 or 1001 been crowned the first King of Hungary, was given in marriage to a member of the Aba clan around 1009. However, historians still debate whether Samuel himself or Samuel's father married the royal princess. If Samuel was her husband, he must have been born before 990 and converted either from Judaism or paganismto Christianity when he married Stephen I's sister. His Christian credentials are further evidenced by Samuel's establishment of an abbey at Abasár which was recorded by Hungarian chronicles. According to Gyula Kristó and other historians, Samuel's conversion coincided with the creation of the Roman Catholic Diocese of Eger encompassing his domains.

Samuel held important offices during the reign of King Stephen. Pál Engel proposes that Abaújvár ("Aba's new castle") was named after him, implying that he was also the first ispán, or head, of that fortress and the county surrounding it. Samuel was a member of the royal council and became the first palatine of Hungary. The death of King Stephen on 15 August 1038 led to his nephew, Peter Orseolo of Venice, ascending to the throne. The new monarch preferred his German and Italian courtiers and set aside the native lords, including Samuel. In 1041, discontented Hungarian noblemen expelled King Peter in a coup d'état and elected Samuel king.

King of Hungary

Samuel abolished all laws introduced by Peter the Venetian and had many of his predecessor's supporters killed or tortured. The contemporaneous Hermann of Reichenau even called him "the tyrant of Hungary" in his Chronicon. Hungarian chronicles sharply criticized Samuel for socializing with the peasants instead of the nobles. Samuel even abolished some levies payable by the commoners.

Following his ousting, Peter the Venetian took refuge in Germany. In response, Samuel stormed Austria in 1042, provoking a retaliatory invasion by the German monarch, Henry III in 1043. It forced Samuel to renounce all Hungarian territories to the west of the rivers Leitha and Morava as well as agree to the payment of a tribute. The funding of the tribute payment was through new taxes on the Christian prelates and seizure of Church estates. This policy caused discontent even among the members of Samuel's own council. He had a number of his councillors executed during Lent. In order to punish the king, Bishop Gerard of Csanád (modern-day Cenad, Romania) refused to perform the annual ceremony of putting the royal crown upon the monarch's head at Easter.

King Henry III again invaded Hungary in 1044 to restore Peter the Venetian. The decisive battle was fought at Ménfő near Győr, where Samuel's army was routed. Samuel's fate following the battle is still uncertain. According to nearly contemporaneous German sources, he was captured in short order and executed on Peter the Venetian's command. However, 14th-century Hungarian chronicles narrate that he fled up the river Tisza where he was seized and murdered by the locals. The latter sources further state that Samuel was first buried in a nearby church, but was later transferred to his family's monastery at Abasár.

Family
No report on the fate of Samuel's widow and children has been preserved. Even so, historiansincluding Gyula Kristó  and László Szegfűsuppose that the powerful Aba family descended from him.

See also
Aba (family)
Abaújvár

References

Sources

Primary sources

Anonymus, Notary of King Béla: The Deeds of the Hungarians (Edited, Translated and Annotated by Martyn Rady and László Veszprémy). In: Rady, Martyn; Veszprémy, László; Bak, János M. (2010); Anonymus and Master Roger; CEU Press; .
Herman of Reichenau: Chronicle. In: Eleventh-Century Germany: The Swabian Chronicles (selected sources translated and annotated with an introduction by I. S. Robinson) (2008); Manchester University Press; .
The Hungarian Illuminated Chronicle: Chronica de Gestis Hungarorum (Edited by Dezső Dercsényi) (1970). Corvina, Taplinger Publishing. .

Secondary sources

|-

1044 deaths
Kings of Hungary
Aba (genus)
Aba, Samuel
Year of birth unknown
Executed monarchs
10th-century Hungarian people
11th-century Hungarian people